Benedetto Velli was an Italian painter of the Baroque period. He was born in Florence, and flourished in the 17th century. He painted an Ascension for the cathedral at Pistoia.

References

17th-century Italian painters
Italian male painters
Painters from Florence
Italian Baroque painters
Year of death unknown
Year of birth unknown